James Jamieson (3 November 1867–unknown) was a Scottish footballer who played in the Football League for Everton and The Wednesday. He was a strong signing for Wednesday, being a regular there for five seasons and a reserve in a sixth; he played four times in the club's run to the 1896 FA Cup Final, but did not take part in the match itself, which they won. He had begun his career in Scotland with Cambuslang.

References

1867 births
Date of death unknown
Scottish footballers
English Football League players
Scottish Football League players
Association football wing halves
Cambuslang F.C. players
Everton F.C. players
Sheffield Wednesday F.C. players
People from Lockerbie
Footballers from Dumfries and Galloway